Boalsburg is an unincorporated community and census-designated place (CDP) in Harris Township, Centre County, Pennsylvania, United States. It is part of the State College, Pennsylvania Metropolitan Statistical Area. The population was 3,722 at the 2010 census. The village claims to be the birthplace of Memorial Day. However, that claim was brought into question by Bellware and Gardiner in their book, The Genesis of the Memorial Day Holiday in America, in 2014. In their book, Bellware and Gardiner point out that the Boalsburg story was first published in 1904, forty years after the fact with no indication that General Logan drew inspiration from any activities in Boalsburg and no evidence that it started the holiday.

History
The name "Boalsburg" comes from the Boal family who settled the region after emigrating from County Londonderry, Ireland.  The fourth generation of the Boal family, Col. Theodore Davis Boal, married Mathilde de Lagarde whose mother's sister Victoria married Diego Santiago Colón, a descendant of Christopher Columbus. Mathilde inherited a portion of her aunt Victoria's estate in 1908 and brought the Columbus Chapel to the Boal Mansion from Spain in 1919 This inheritance included an admiral's desk that family tradition says belonged to Columbus himself. The Columbus Chapel and Boal Mansion Museum are open to the public. Boalsburg originally was on the main road for travelers from Philadelphia to Pittsburgh, with the David Boal tavern that housed travelers still standing today. Boalsburg is home to the Pennsylvania Military Museum, as well as the headquarters of the Civil War reenacting unit, 3rd Pennsylvania Light Artillery Battery B.

The Boalsburg Historic District and Hill House were added to the National Register of Historic Places in 1977. The Boal Mansion was added the following year.

The town has a market square design known as 'the Diamond', a common design feature of towns in the northern province of Ulster in Ireland, the style of which was imported by emigrants from Ulster to Pennsylvania.

Geography
Boalsburg is located in southern Centre County at  (40.782670, -77.786899). It occupies the central and northern sections of Harris Township and extends northwest slightly into College Township. It borders Rothrock State Forest.

In the other direction US 322 leads east and then south  to Lewistown.

Spring Creek flows northward through Boalsburg towards Bald Eagle Creek, a tributary of the West Branch Susquehanna River. The Tussey Mountain Ski Area is located on the eastern edge of Boalsburg.

Demographics

As of the census of 2010, there were 3,722 people, 1,523 households, and 1,076 families residing in the CDP. The population density was 602.5 people per square mile (232.6/km). There were 1,613 housing units at an average density of 260.2/sq mi (100.5/km). The racial makeup of the CDP was 93.5% White, 2.2% Black or African American, 0.1% Native American, 2.0% Asian, 0.4% from other races, and 1.7% from two or more races. Hispanic or Latino of any race were 1.6% of the population.

There were 1,523 households, out of which 31.7% had children under the age of 18 living with them, 57.8% were married couples living together, 3.5% had a male householder with no wife present, 9.4% had a female householder with no husband present, and 29.3% were non-families. 23.4% of all households were made up of individuals, and 8.0% had someone living alone who was 65 years of age or older. The average household size was 2.44 and the average family size was 2.89.

In the CDP, the population was spread out, with 23.3% under the age of 18, 7.4% from 18 to 24, 22.6% from 25 to 44, 32.4% from 45 to 64, and 14.3% who were 65 years of age or older. The median age was 43 years. For every 100 females, there were 91.9 males. For every 100 females age 18 and over, there were 89.1 males.

The median income for a household in the CDP was $62,289, and the median income for a family was $70,612.  The per capita income for the CDP was $32,676. About 4.7% of families and 6.0% of the population were below the poverty line, including 11.6% of those under age 18 and 2.6% of those age 65 or over.

References

External links
 Boalsburg community website
 Boalsburg Village, another community website
 Boalsburg Central, third community website
 Parks in Boalsburg
 Boal Museum

Census-designated places in Centre County, Pennsylvania
Census-designated places in Pennsylvania